On Fire is a studio album of Latin jazz music, mostly by the Dominican composer Michel Camilo. It was released in 1989.

Track listing 
"Island Stomp" (Michel Camilo)
"If You Knew..." (Michel Camilo)
"Uptown Manhattan" (Michel Camilo)
"Friends (Interlude II/Suite Sandrine)" (Michel Camilo)
"Hands and Feet" (Michel Camilo)
"This Way Out" (Michel Camilo)
"In Love" (Michel Camilo)
"And Sammy Walked In" (Michel Camilo)
"Softly, As in a Morning Sunrise" (Oscar Hammerstein II; Sigmund Romberg)
"On Fire" (Michel Camilo)

Personnel 

Michel Camilo - Piano
Marc Johnson - Bass 
Marvin "Smitty" Smith - Drums 
Michael Bowie - Bass 
Sammy Figueroa - Conga 
Joel Rosenblatt - Drums 
Dave Weckl - Drums

External links 
Michel Camilo discography

References

1989 albums
Michel Camilo albums